The MV Lairdsfield was a British motor cargo vessel that capsized. On 6 February 1970 she was en route to Cork, Republic of Ireland from Teesport, North Yorkshire, England. The ship capsized in Tees Bay, 1 nm East of Teesport, resulting in the deaths of all ten crew. MV Lairdsfield was raised and later broken up at Middlesbrough in March 1970.

References

1970 disasters in the United Kingdom
Maritime incidents in 1970